Richard Edward Tarrell (May 5, 1856 – July 8, 1942) was a member of the Wisconsin State Assembly.

Biography
Tarrell was born on May 5, 1856, in Paris, Grant County, Wisconsin. In 1878, he moved to Elk Grove, Wisconsin.

Career
Tarrell was elected to the Assembly in 1902. Previously, he had served as a member of the Elk Grove Board of Supervisors, Treasurer of Elk Grove, Chairman of the Board of Elk Grove and Sheriff of Lafayette County, Wisconsin. He was a Republican.

References

External links
 
The Political Graveyard

People from Grant County, Wisconsin
People from Lafayette County, Wisconsin
Republican Party members of the Wisconsin State Assembly
Wisconsin sheriffs
Wisconsin city council members
Mayors of places in Wisconsin
1856 births
1942 deaths
Burials in South Dakota